The President of the Board of Trade is head of the Board of Trade. This is a committee of the Privy Council of the United Kingdom, first established as a temporary committee of inquiry in the 17th century, that evolved gradually into a government department with a diverse range of functions. The current holder of the post is Kemi Badenoch, who is concurrently the Secretary of State for Business and Trade.

History 

The idea of a Board of Trade was first translated into action by Oliver Cromwell in 1655 when he appointed his son Richard Cromwell to head a body of Lords of the Privy Council, judges and merchants to consider measures to promote trade. Charles II established a Council of Trade on 7 November 1660 followed by a Council of Foreign Plantations on 1 December that year. The two were united on 16 September 1672 as the Board of Trade and Plantations.

After the Board was re-established in 1696, there were 15 (and later 16) members of the Boardthe 7 (later 8) great officers of state, and 8 unofficial members, who did the majority of the work. The senior unofficial member of the board was the president of the board, commonly known as the first lord of trade. The board was abolished on 11 July 1782, but a Committee of the Privy Council was established on 5 March 1784 for the same purposes. On 23 August 1786 a new committee was set up, more strongly focused on commercial functions than the previous boards of trade. At first the president of the Board of Trade only occasionally sat in the Cabinet, but from the early 19th century it was usually a cabinet-level position.

In 2020, there was an unusual appointment of a deputy president to assist the president, but the holder remained only an adviser to the Board. This appears to have been a one-off appointment, and this role no longer exists. However, the president was previously assisted by the vice president.

List of presidents of the Board of Trade

First Lord of Trade (1672–1782)

President of the Committee on Trade and Foreign Plantations (1784–1786)

President of the Board of Trade (1786–1900)

President of the Board of Trade (1900–1963)

President of the Board of Trade (1963–present)

Notes

References 

Lists of government ministers of the United Kingdom
Ministerial offices in the United Kingdom
 
Trade ministers of the United Kingdom